The Transparent Factory is a car factory and exhibition space in Dresden, Germany owned by German carmaker Volkswagen and designed by architect Gunter Henn.  It originally opened in 2002, producing the Volkswagen Phaeton until 2016.  As of 2017 it produces the electric version of the Golf.

Meaning
The original German name is Gläserne Manufaktur (meaning factory made of glass). Both the German and English names are a word play on the double meaning of transparent and glassy, referring to both optical transparency and transparency of the production process. It is .93 miles (1.5 kilometres) long.

Car factory
The factory originally assembled Volkswagen's luxury sedan, the Phaeton. It used 60,000 magnets in its fully automated assembly line.  Spare capacity was also used to build Bentley Continental Flying Spur vehicles destined for the European market until 2006, when all work was transferred to Bentley's  plant in Crewe, England. Production of the Bentley Flying Spur resumed in late 2013. The factory only handled final assembly. Operations such as stamping and welding and the painting of the steel bodies took place in Zwickau. Painted bodies arrived at the factory by truck. The other 1200 parts and 34 preassembled components were shipped to a logistics center and are transported to the factory by CarGoTrams that run on Dresden's public transport tracks. All vehicle production at the factory ended in March 2016, before restarting again in 2017. The Volkswagen ID.3 is produced here since 2021, sharing production with the Zwickau-Mosel Plant.

Location
The Transparent Factory is situated in the city center of Dresden, an 800-year-old baroque city known for its arts and craftsmanship. It stands in a corner of the Großer Garten, where a convention center was located before the Second World War. The factory's walls are made almost completely of glass. Its floors are covered entirely in Canadian maple.  Its visitor-friendly layout was designed to accommodate up to 250 tourists per day. There are no smokestacks, no loud noises, and no toxic byproducts. Volkswagen planted 350 trees in the grounds.

Current visitor experience
Visitors can test drive VW electric vehicles for 30 minutes, take a virtual tour of Dresden and look at various exhibits relating to VW's electric and hybrid technologies.

Previous visitor experience
The Gläserne Manufaktur also provided visitors with a series of educational attractions relating to the VW "Phaeton".  The attractions, designed by BRC Imagination Arts, include Vision World, a multimedia "global theater" that allows visitors to take the pulse of the planet in real time; a Virtual Test drive, featuring a real VW Phaeton combined with motion base technology and computer generated scenery; a computer-based Car Configurator that enables visitors to design the VW Phaeton of their dreams; an interactive Techwall explaining the workings of the Phaeton's "infotainment" system; a Virtual Production Tour; and a media-enhanced Delivery Experience for customers taking possession of new vehicles.

The German TV channel ZDF occasionally films a philosophical panel discussion in the Transparent Factory, "Das philosophische Quartett" (The Philosophical Quartet).

To stop birds from flying into the glass, an outdoor speaker system emulates bird vocalisations marking the territory as "taken".

Future
The factory is to be renovated to enable it to produce luxury and electric cars.

Gallery

References

External links

Gläserne Manufaktur
Photo tour
Megaworld

Volkswagen Group factories
Buildings and structures in Dresden
Motor vehicle assembly plants in Germany
Tourist attractions in Dresden